The Wireless Technology Industry Association (WTIA) is a non-profit trade association based in Hong Kong to promote the development, usage and awareness of wireless technology applications in Hong Kong; and to enhance communication and partnership between different types of companies in the wireless technology industry.

WTIA acts as a platform, an aggregator, and community for industry professionals to learn and drive emerging wireless and mobile technologies, governance, and standards.

Asia Smart App Awards
The awards is organised by WTIA annually with the support of Create Hong Kong (CreateHK) of the Government of the Hong Kong Special Administrative Region. The “Hong Kong Mobile Apps Industry Survey”, is commissioned by WTIA, a project of the Hong Kong Productivity Council (HKPC), as part of its annual Asia Smart App Awards Summit.

WTIA conducts Asia Smart Apps Contest at Cyberport to organise the Asia Smart App Awards in collaboration with other co-organizers from the Mainland China, Israel, Indonesia, Japan, Korea, Malaysia, Philippines, Singapore, Taiwan, Thailand, Vietnam, Sri Lanka and Myanmar.

See also
 Hong Kong Telecom

References

External links 
 
 WTIA Response to 2007 Public Consultation on Digital 21 Strategy

 HK  Wi-Fi Security Survey 2009 2009

 Hong Kong’s First Mobility Experience Centre presented by Cyberport and Wireless Technology Industry Association to showcase the latest mobile technologies

 ITC’s Consultation Paper on “New Strategy of Innovation and Technology Development”

 Speech by PSCT at Hong Kong International Wireless Conference

Industry trade groups based in Hong Kong
Telecommunication industry
Technology trade associations